Kureh Darreh-ye Olya (also Romanized as Kūreh Darreh-ye ‘Olyā; also known as Kūreh Darreh-ye Bālā) is a village in Zhavehrud Rural District, in the Central District of Kamyaran County, Kurdistan Province, Iran. At the 2006 census, its population was 176, in 38 families. The village is populated by Kurds.

References 

Towns and villages in Kamyaran County
Kurdish settlements in Kurdistan Province